The Sri Lanka tree crab, (Perbrinckia scansor), is a species of freshwater crabs of the family Gecarcinucidae that is endemic to Sri Lanka. It is the only known tree climbing freshwater crab found in the country. The crab is discovered from 11 localities from Sri Lanka throughout Kalu River, Walawe River and Gin River basins. Adult are known to survive well in rainwater-filled tree hollows of trees such as Shorea sp., Artocarpus sp., Dillenia sp., Garcinia sp., Myristica sp., and Gyrinops walla. Females with youngs can be seen during February and March on the ground, never within tree hollows. The known predators are Greater coucal, White-throated kingfisher, Sri Lanka grey hornbill and Eurasian otter.

The species is categorized as least concern by IUCN, but the habitats are gradually declining. The water bodies of central hills are invaded by exotic species of fish and other aquatic flora and usage of many areas for human habitations are known to harm the animal. They are also collected illegally and used for many purposes local and overseas.

References

External links
photos of Perbrinckia scansor
Range extension of Perbrinckia scansor (Crustacea) in Sri Lanka

Gecarcinucoidea
Freshwater crustaceans of Asia
Crustaceans of Sri Lanka
Endemic fauna of Sri Lanka